The Office of the Attorney General of the Nation of Panama (or Public Prosecutor's Office) is responsible for investigating and suppressing crimes. Likewise, the office is an autonomous entity— as it does not belong to either the Executive, Legislative or Judicial Branch. Due to the constitutional and legal power to exercise the action of the Panamanian state, the office participates in the administrative process of justice and even monitors public officials. The Attorney General is the superior head of the Public Ministry of Panama. 

The current attorney general is Kenia Isolda Porcell Díaz, who worked as a law professor and attorney prior to her official appointment in 2015.

See also 
 Attorney general
Ministry of Government and Justice (Panama)
 Procuraduría General de la Nación (Panamá) [Office of the Attorney General (Panama)]
 Politics of Panama

References 

Attorneys general
Government of Panama